Anderson Dome is a prominent ice-covered dome mountain rising to  on the east side of Gopher Glacier,  east of the similar-appearing Bonnabeau Dome, in the Jones Mountains in Antarctica. It was mapped by the University of Minnesota Jones Mountains Party, 1960–61, and named by them for Joe M. Anderson, a United States Geological Survey topographic engineer with the party.

References 

Ice caps of Antarctica
Bodies of ice of Ellsworth Land